New Zealand national field hockey team may refer to:
 New Zealand men's national field hockey team
 New Zealand women's national field hockey team